Achriesgill is a village that lies on the eastern bank of Loch Inchard in Lairg, Sutherland, in the Scottish council area of Highland. 

In 1945, a documentary on the Scottish agricultural tradition of crofting called CROFTERS was released, which was both filmed in and featured Achriesgill.

References

Populated places in Sutherland